Martynov, or Martynova (feminine; Мартынова) is a common Russian last name. It is derived from the male given name Martyn and literally means 'Martyn's'. It may refer to:

Aleksandr Nikolayevich Martynov (1892–1956), a Russian international football player
Alexander Samoylovich Martynov (1865–1935), a right-wing Russian Menshevik
Alexander Vasilyevich Martynov (1919–1980), a Soviet aircraft pilot and Hero of the Soviet Union
Alexander Yevstafyevich Martynov (1816–1860), a Russian actor
Aleksei Martynov (b. 1978), a Russian footballer
Alexey Alexandrovich Martynov (1818–1903), a Russian historian, archaeologist, and architect
Alexey Petrovich Martynov (1920–1994), a Soviet aircraft pilot and Hero of the Soviet Union
Alexey Vasilyevich Martynov (1868–1934), a Russian surgeon
Andrei Martynov (footballer) (b. 1965), a Turkmenistani international footballer
Andrey Andreevich, name of several people
Andrey Yefimovich Martynov (1768–1826), a Russian painter and engraver
Leonid Martynov (1905–1980), a Soviet poet
Mikhail Martynov (1909–1986), a Soviet aircraft pilot and Hero of the Soviet Union
Moisey Martynov (1909–?), a Soviet army officer and Hero of the Soviet Union
Nikolai Martynov (1815–1875), a Russian army officer who shot Mikhail Lermontov
Sergei Martynov, name of several people
Yevgeny Ivanovich Martynov (1864–1937), a Russian military historian
Yevgeny Grigoryevich Martynov (1948–1990), a Soviet singer
Yevgeny Martynov, a Ukrainian figure skater
Vladimir Martynov (b. 1946), a Russian composer of classical music